The Space Between the Shadows is the third studio album from American musician Scott Stapp, released by Napalm Records on July 19, 2019. "Purpose for Pain" serves as the lead single.

Track listing
Adapted from iTunes.

Personnel
Musicians
Scott Stapp – lead vocals
Sammy Hudson – bass guitar, backing vocals
Ben Flanders – guitar, backing vocals
Yiannis Papadopoulos – lead guitar
Dango Cellan – drums

Production
 Scott Stevens – co-producer, engineer
 Marti Frederiksen – co-producer, engineer
 Kevin "Thrasher" Gruft – additional production on "Purpose for Pain"
 Chris Baseford – mixing
 Howie Weinberg – mastering

Charts

References

2019 albums
Napalm Records albums
Scott Stapp albums